PostalWatch Incorporated is a Virginia not-for-profit organization formed to "protect individuals and the small business community from" United States Postal Service actions and regulations which they deem "intrusive and burdensome." It fought against an initiative by the postal service to forbid people and companies who receive mail through a commercial mail receiving agency such as Mailboxes Etc. from listing their private mail box number as a suite rather than a PMB in their mailing address. PostalWatch was founded in 1999.

PostalWatch's founder Richard H. Merritt died on June 18, 2006. As of July 18, 2006, the PostalWatch website's homepage featured only a picture of Merritt, the announcement of his death from cancer, and a thank you from the family. The site seemed to offer no further functionality.

References 
Federal Times:  Mail delivery practices unchanged after Supreme Court ruling, By Dan Davidson - March 16, 2006 Quotes Merritt as saying: "But if you are an enterprising attorney, you might want to choose someone easier to sue than the Postal Service."
 Federal Times - (Postal Rate Commission) Commission nominee opposed, By Stephen Losey, August 23, 2004 PostalWatch Executive Director Rick Merritt criticized the nomination of Dawn Tisdale (a former postmaster) to the United States Postal Rate Commission
DMnews.com, April 7th, 2005: Consumer Groups Outline Wishes for Postal Reform Several groups, including PostalWatch, argue for greater financial transparency and cost control at the United States Postal Service.
San Diego Union-Tribune, December 18, 2005: Late mail deliveries have become common problem countywide Includes an interview with Rick Merritt of PostalWatch.

United States Postal Service
Companies based in Virginia
Non-profit organizations based in the United States
American companies established in 1999